Hellinsia nuwara is a moth of the family Pterophoridae. It is found in Sri Lanka.

References

External links

Moths described in 2001
nuwara
Moths of Sri Lanka